The women's basketball tournament at the 2022 Mediterranean Games was held from 30 June to 3 July at the Sidi M'hamed Public Garden Court, in Oran, Algeria.

Preliminary round 
All times are local (UTC+1).

Group A

Group B

Group C

Elimination round

Bracket
Championship  bracket

Fifth place bracket

Ninth place bracket

Quarterfinals

9–11th place semifinal

5–8th place semifinals

Semifinals

Ninth place game

Seventh place game

Fifth place game

Bronze medal game

Gold medal game

Final standings

References

Women